Shiromani Akali Dal (Taksali) was an Indian political party which was formed by Ranjit Singh Brahmpura, Rattan Singh Ajnala and Sewa Singh Sekhwan on 16 December 2018. On 4 November 2018, Shiromani Akali Dal expelled Sewa Singh Sekhwan the former Punjab Minister and then on 12 November 2018 expelled Ranjit Singh Brahmpura MP from Khadoor Sahib (Lok Sabha constituency), Rattan Singh Ajnala former MP, Ravinder Singh Brahmpura and Amarpal Singh Ajnala from the party.

All were expelled from the party because they accused the party president Sukhbir Singh Badal and the former minister Bikram Singh Majithia of destroying the reputation of the party, Akal Takht and of the Shiromani Gurudwara Prabandhak Committee.

On same day, the party also declared it would contest all seats in 2019 in the Lok Sabha Polls and in 2022 in the Punjab Legislative Assembly Polls.

Shiromani Akali Dal (Taksali) became the member of Punjab Democratic Alliance in 2018 but due to differences on seats sharing it left the alliance and joined hands with Aam Aadmi Party for Lok sabha election in Punjab. However, it failed to make consensus with AAP on seats sharing and decided to contest election alone.

Harsukhinder Singh Bubby Badal is leading the youth wing of SAD (Taksali) and is rabidly opposed to his close relatives, the Badal’s. He bid farewell to his family accusing them of being anti Panthic specially Sukhbir’s notorious brother-in-law Bikram Majithia, whom he accused of trying to take over Akali dal party through the back door. In 2019 General elections, the party is fighting only 1 seat i.e. Anandpur Sahib (Lok Sabha constituency)

On 13 February 2020, Amarpal Singh Ajnala rejoined Shiromani Akali Dal in presence of Sukhbir Singh Badal. On July 7, 2020 , The Dhindsa Family, Sewa Sekhwan, and many more Party members left the Party and made their own party. Of four founders of SAD Taksali formed on Dec 16,2018 only two Ranjit Singh Brampura and Manmohan Singh Sathiala left. Other two Rattan Singh and Sewa Singh left it in February 2020 and July 2020. It was the 100th year of foundation of Shiromani Akali Dal by taksali sikh freedom fighters.

In April 2021 the party merged with Sukhdev Singh Dhindsa’s Shiromani Akali Dal (Democratic) to form a new party named Shiromani Akali Dal (Sanyukt)

References

 
Political parties established in 2018
Political parties in Punjab, India
2018 establishments in Punjab, India